Bulbophyllum gadgarrense, commonly known as the tangled rope orchid, is a species of epiphytic orchid with small pseudobulbs hidden beneath purplish brown bracts, dark green, grooved leaves and small white flowers with orange or yellow tips. It grows on rainforest trees in tropical North Queensland.

Description
The flowers are whitish with orange or yellow tips. Flowering occurs from July to September.

Taxonomy and naming
Bulbophyllum gadgarrense was first formally described in 1949 by Herman Rupp who published the description in Proceedings of the Royal Society of Queensland from a specimen collected near Gadgarra on the Atherton Tableland by Frank Kajewski. The specific epithet (gadgarrense) is a reference to the type location.

Distribution and habitat
Bulbophyllum minutissimum grows on mossy parts of rainforest trees where there is good air movement. It occurs between the Big Tableland and the Tully River in Queensland.

References

gadgarrense
Orchids of Queensland
Endemic orchids of Australia
Plants described in 1949